John George Will (22 September 1892 – 25 March 1917), nicknamed the "Flying Scot," was a Scottish rugby union player and a Lieutenant in the Royal Flying Corps killed in World War I.

Will was born in Merton, Surrey, the son of Scottish physician John Kennedy Will (from Cullen, Moray) and Ella Ryng Will (from St Helens, Lancashire). He was educated at Merchant Taylors' School (1905–11) and then Downing College, Cambridge, where he played for Cambridge University RFC. Will had played in the last match before the war, the Calcutta Cup match at Inverleith against , alongside James Huggan who died in 1914, and Frederick Harding Turner and Eric Templeton Young, who died in 1915.

Will joined the Honourable Artillery Company when the war began in August 1914 and was sent to France the following month. The following April he was commissioned into the Worcestershire Hussars and then switched to the Leinster Regiment the next month. In August 1915, he was wounded in action near Hooge, Belgium. He joined the Royal Flying Corps that November and earned his pilot's certificate in England in June 1916. He remained in England as an instructor in Dover before returning to the front in February 1917 with the No. 29 Squadron.

Death
Few official details are available concerning Will's death. According to Nigel McCrery, who wrote the book Into Touch: Rugby Internationals Killed in the Great War, on the morning of 25 March 1917, Will took off from Le Hameau in a Nieuport 17 A6751 in a five-plane escort mission, and he and Lieutenant Christopher Guy Gilbert (aka the Dorset Flyer) never made it back. They were apparently attacked by the Red Baron's Flying Circus. Gilbert was shot down by the Baron, while Will was shot by the baron's brother Lothar von Richthofen.

Will's grave was found in December 1917, after the Allied forces made inroads into German-held territory. He was buried with a cross made from a broken propeller:

Will's remains were not reburied. He is commemorated at the Arras Flying Services Memorial.

Commemoration
On 25 March 2017 A commemoration ceremony was held in the Memorial Garden of Merchant Taylors' School. A 36-page booklet giving full biographical details was produced and is available 
here.
Unique to the commemoration was that Will's nephew, Roger Hamer, was traced and was able to attend. He donated much memorabilia, including a fragment from Will's propeller, that is now stored at the School archives

References

External links
 "An entire team wiped out by the Great War".  The Scotsman, 6 November 2009
 "Biography compiled at Downing College Cambridge"
  "OMT Society memorial to Will 1917"

1892 births
1917 deaths
Alumni of Downing College, Cambridge
British Army personnel of World War I
British military personnel killed in World War I
British World War I pilots
Honourable Artillery Company soldiers
People educated at Merchant Taylors' School, Northwood
Royal Flying Corps officers
Rugby union players from Merton
Scotland international rugby union players
Scottish rugby union players
Worcestershire Yeomanry officers